Joe Kittell is an American college basketball coach, formerly the head coach for the University of Mary Marauders.

A native of Garrison, North Dakota, Kittell began his coaching career as a student assistant at North Dakota State University from 2002 to 2006. He was then hired at Mayville State University and spent only one season there before leaving for the North Dakota State College of Science, but again was only there for one season. From there, he went to Breckenridge High School (Minnesota) where he was the assistant boys' basketball coach. While there he also directed Every Child's Important (ECI) Youth Services, a non-profit organization that runs summer traveling basketball teams in South Dakota, North Dakota, and Minnesota.

During the 2009–10 season, Kittell was the a video coordinator at Colorado State University in Fort Collins, Colorado. Afterwards, he was hired as an assistant coach at Gillette College for three years.

In 2013, Kittell was hired to his first head coaching job at Lake Region State College in Devils Lake, North Dakota. During his two seasons there, he led the Royals to a record of 42–20.

Kittell was hired as the head coach of the University of Mary in Bismarck, North Dakota on April 16, 2015. 

After the 2020-21 season, Kittell stepped down as the head coach of the Marauders and was replaced by Jack Nelson.

Samaritan's Feet
In 2017, Kittell was named as the Samaritan's Feet Coach of the Year.

Head Coaching Record

References

Year of birth missing (living people)
Living people
Basketball coaches from North Dakota
College men's basketball head coaches in the United States
Colorado State Rams men's basketball coaches
Lake Region State Royals men's basketball coaches
Mayville State Comets men's basketball coaches
North Dakota State Bison men's basketball coaches